European Round Table may refer to:

European Retail Round Table, a European organization that represents companies from the European retail sector
European Round Table of Industrialists, a European organization that represents companies from the European industrial sector